Miloš Lučić (born 19 November 1986) is a Bosnian Serb politician from the Democratic People's Alliance. He was Minister of Human Rights and Refugees in the Cabinet of Zoran Tegeltija from 2020 to 2022.

References 

Living people
1986 births
Government ministers of Bosnia and Herzegovina
21st-century Bosnia and Herzegovina people

Serbs of Bosnia and Herzegovina